There are three sets of gallium halides, the trihalides where gallium has oxidation state +3, the intermediate halides containing gallium in oxidation states +1, +2 and +3 and some unstable monohalides, where gallium has oxidation state +1.

Trihalides
All four trihalides are known. They all contain gallium in the +3 oxidation state. Their proper names are gallium(III) fluoride, gallium(III) chloride, gallium(III) bromide and gallium(III) iodide.
GaF3
GaF3 is a white solid which sublimes before it melts, with an estimated melting point above 1000 °C. It contains 6 co-ordinate gallium atoms with a three-dimensional network of GaF6 octahedra sharing common corners.
GaCl3, GaBr3 and GaI3
These all have lower melting points than GaF3, (GaCl3 mp 78 °C, GaBr3 mp 122 °C, GaI3 mp 212 °C) reflecting the fact that their structures  all contain dimers with 4 coordinate gallium atoms and 2 bridging halogen atoms. They are all Lewis acids, forming mainly 4 co-ordinate adducts. GaCl3 is the most commonly used trihalide.

Intermediate halides
Intermediate chlorides, bromides and iodides exist. They contain gallium in oxidation states +1, +2 and +3.
Ga3Cl7

This compound contains the Ga2Cl7− ion, which has a structure similar to the dichromate, Cr2O72−, ion with two tetrahedrally coordinated gallium atoms sharing a corner.  The compound can be formulated as gallium(I) heptachlorodigallate(III), GaI GaIII2Cl7.

{| class="wikitable" style="text-align:center;"
| ||  || 
|-
|unit cell of Ga3Cl7||part of the crystal structure||structure of [Ga2Cl7]−
|-
|}

GaCl2, GaBr2 and GaI2
These are the best known and most studied intermediate halides. They contain gallium in oxidation states +1 and +3 and are formulated GaIGaIIIX4. The dihalides are unstable in the presence of water disproportionating to gallium metal and gallium(III) entities. They are soluble in aromatic solvents, where arene complexes have been isolated and the arene is η6 coordinated to the Ga+ ion. With some ligands, L, e.g. dioxane, a neutral complex, Ga2X2L2, with a gallium-gallium bond is produced.  These compounds have been used as a route into gallium chain and cluster compounds.
Ga2Br3 and Ga2I3
These are formulated GaI2 GaII2Br6 and GaI2 GaII2I6 respectively. Both anions contain a gallium-gallium bond where gallium has a formal oxidation state of +2. The Ga2Br62− anion is eclipsed like the In2Br62− anion in In2Br3 whereas the Ga2I62− anion is isostructural with Si2Cl6 with a staggered conformation.

Monohalides
None of the monohalides are stable at room temperature. The previously reported GaBr and GaI produced from fusing gallium with the trihalide have been shown to be mixtures of metallic gallium with, respectively, Ga2Br3 and Ga2I3.
GaCl and GaBr
GaCl and GaBr have been produced in the gas form from the reaction of HX and molten gallium using a special reactor. They have been isolated by quenching the high temperature gas at 77 K. GaCl is reported as a red solid that disproportionates above 0 °C. Both GaCl and GaBr produced in this way can be stabilised in suitable solvents. The metastable solutions formed in this way have been used as precursors to numerous gallium cluster compounds.
In the HVPE production of GaN, GaCl is produced by passing HCl gas over molten gallium which is then reacted with NH3 gas.
GaI
GaI is produced as a reactive green powder, which has been hailed as a "versatile reagent for the synthetic chemist".  The chemical structure of the reagent termed ‘GaI’ produced from reacting gallium metal with iodine in toluene using ultrasound has only recently been investigated using 69/71Ga solid-state NMR and a tentative structure assigned which includes gallium metal atoms, [Ga0]2[Ga]+[GaI4]−.

Anionic halide complexes
Salts containing GaCl4−, GaBr4− and GaI4− are all known. Gallium is very different from indium in that it is only known to form  6 coordinate complexes with the fluoride ion. This can be rationalised by the smaller size of gallium (ionic radii of Ga(III) 62 pm, In(III) 80 pm).

Salts containing the Ga2Cl62− anion, where gallium has an oxidation state of +2, are known.

General references 
 WebElements

Footnotes 

Gallium compounds
Metal halides
Mixed_valence_compounds